Sergio Pugliese (1908–1965) was an Italian screenwriter, playwright and journalist. He was employed by the Italian state broadcaster RAI and in 1955 he made the original proposal that led eventually to the establishment of the Eurovision Song Contest.

Selected filmography
 The Reluctant Hero (1941)
 Torrents of Spring (1942)
 The White Angel (1943)
 Men of the Mountain (1943)
 Mist on the Sea (1944)
 Barrier to the North (1950)
 Tragic Return (1952)
 Il Mattatore (1960)

References

Bibliography
 Goble, Alan. The Complete Index to Literary Sources in Film. Walter de Gruyter, 1999.

External links

1908 births
1965 deaths
20th-century Italian screenwriters
Italian male screenwriters
Italian male journalists
Italian dramatists and playwrights
People from Ivrea
20th-century Italian journalists
20th-century Italian male writers